Prachya Hong-In (born June 14, 1983) is a former professional footballer from Thailand.

References

External links
Profile at Thaipremierleague.co.th

1983 births
Living people
Prachya Hong-In
Prachya Hong-In
Association football defenders
Prachya Hong-In
Prachya Hong-In
Prachya Hong-In
Prachya Hong-In
Prachya Hong-In
Prachya Hong-In